Rud-e Faryab (also Romanized as Rūd-e Fāryāb and Rūd Fāryāb; also known as Fārīāb, Pāreyow, Rūh Fārīāb, and Rūḩ Fāryāb) is a village in Eram Rural District of Eram District, Dashtestan County, Bushehr province, Iran. At the 2006 census, its population was 1,695 in 363 households. The following census in 2011 counted 1,860 people in 455 households. The latest census in 2016 showed a population of 1,917 people in 539 households; it was the largest village in its rural district.

References 

Populated places in Dashtestan County